The Suphannahong National Film Awards (also known as the Thailand National Film Association Awards) is the primary film award of the Thai film industry. It is given annually by the National Federation of Motion Pictures and Contents Associations (MPC), and is named after the trophy statuette designed in the shape of the figurehead of the Royal Barge Suphannahong.

History
The first film awards dedicated specifically to Thai films was inspired by Thailand's hosting of the 23rd Asia-Pacific Film Festival in 1977. The Film Producers Association of Thailand then hosted the first Golden Suphannahong Awards in 1979, using the same trophy design created earlier for the Asia-Pacific Film Festival. The Golden Suphannahong Awards were held a total of seven times, and ceased after 1988 when the Film Producers Association stepped back from its de facto leadership role in the Thai film industry.

The Federation of National Film Associations (now the MPC), which took over that role, began presenting a new series of awards, known as the National Film Awards, in 1992 (for films released in 1991). The ceremony was held in association with the Office of the Prime Minister's Film Promotion Board and the government public relations department, and the first awards were presented by Princess Maha Chakri Sirindhorn. It employed a "Milkyway to the Stars" symbol for its trophies. The awards were held annually for nine years, but was halted in 2001 as the Thai film industry produced few films in 2000.

The federation took over responsibility for the event and resumed the awards in 2002. It re-adopted the Suphannahong as its trophy, now redesigned in a more modern style. The awards, now known as the Suphannahong National Film Awards, have been held annually since.

Awards

See also
 Bangkok Critics Assembly Awards, the other major Thai film award

References

External links
 Thailand National Film Association Awards at the Internet Movie Database

Thai film awards
Awards established in 1992
1992 establishments in Thailand